Hugh Fortescue, 3rd Earl Fortescue DL (4 April 1818 – 10 October 1905), known as Viscount Ebrington from 1841 to 1861, was a British peer and occasional Liberal Party politician.

Life

He was born in London on 4 April 1818.
He was the eldest son of Hugh Fortescue, 2nd Earl Fortescue (1783-1861), by his first wife, Lady Susan (died 1827), eldest daughter of Dudley Ryder, 1st Earl of Harrowby.  He was a Cambridge Apostle.

He was appointed Deputy Lieutenant of Devon on 4 March 1839.

He entered the House of Commons in 1841 as a member for Plymouth. He lost this seat in 1852, but returned in 1854 for Marylebone, which seat he held until January 1859, when he resigned. In December of that year, however, he was called up to the House of Lords by a writ of acceleration. In 1861, he succeeded to his father's earldom.

Family
He married Georgiana Augusta Caroline Dawson-Damer (13 June 1826 – 8 Dec 1866), granddaughter of John Dawson, 1st Earl of Portarlington, on 1 March 1847. They had fourteen children:

Lady Susan Elizabeth (born 1848, died 7 July 1919), never married.
Lady Mary Eleanor Fortescue (born 1849, died 12 October 1938), married George Bridgeman.
Lady Lucy Catherine Fortescue (born 1851, died 19 March 1940), married Michael Hicks-Beach, 1st Earl St Aldwyn and had issue.
Lady Georgiana Seymour Fortescue (born 1852, died 24 December 1915), married her cousin, Lord Ernest Seymour, son of Francis Seymour, 5th Marquess of Hertford and had issue.
Hugh Fortescue, 4th Earl Fortescue (born 16 April 1854, died 29 October 1932)
Captain Hon. Sir Seymour John Fortescue, RN (born 10 February 1856, died 20 March 1942), died unmarried.
Major Hon. Lionel Henry Dudley Fortescue (born 19 November 1857, killed in action 11 June 1900), married Emily Adam
Captain Hon. Arthur Grenville Fortescue (born 24 December 1858, died 3 October 1895), of Hudscott, Chittlehampton, Devon, married Lilla Fane and had issue
Major Hon. Sir John William Fortescue (born 28 December 1859, died 22 October 1933), married Winifred Beech
Brigadier-General Hon. Charles Granville Fortescue (born 30 October 1861, died 1 February 1951), married Ethel Clarke, daughter of Sir Charles Clarke, 3rd Baronet and had issue.
Lady Eleanor Hester Fortescue (born 1863, died 11 Sept 1864)
Alice Sophia Fortescue (born 1864, died 12 Nov 1881)
Lady Frances Blanche Fortescue (born 1865, died 24 October 1950), married Archibald Hay Gordon-Duff. Their daughter Jane Minney Gordon-Duff married Ronald Roxburgh.
William George Damer Fortescue, R.N. (born 8 Dec 1866, lost at sea in September 1887)

Notes

References

External links 
 
 
 
 Burke's Peerage, Baronetage & Knightage

|-

1818 births
1905 deaths
Liberal Party (UK) MPs for English constituencies
Fortescue,3
Deputy Lieutenants of Devon
UK MPs 1841–1847
UK MPs 1847–1852
UK MPs 1852–1857
UK MPs 1857–1859
UK MPs who inherited peerages
Politics of the City of Westminster
Hugh,3
Members of the Parliament of the United Kingdom for Plymouth